The men's Greco-Roman 60 kilograms at the 2004 Summer Olympics as part of the wrestling program were held at the Ano Liosia Olympic Hall, August 25 to August 26.

The competition held with an elimination system of three or four wrestlers in each pool, with the winners qualify for the quarterfinals, semifinals and final by way of direct elimination.

Schedule
All times are Eastern European Summer Time (UTC+03:00)

Results

Elimination pools

Pool 1

Pool 2

Pool 3

Pool 4

Pool 5

Pool 6

Pool 7

Knockout round

Final standing

References
Official Report

Greco-Roman 60 kg
Men's events at the 2004 Summer Olympics